Son Jin-young (born October 31, 1985) is a South Korean singer and actor. In 2010, Son joined the singing competition program The Great Birth (also known as Birth of a Great Star) and finished in fourth place. He has since released several singles and frequently appears on variety/reality shows, notably Real Men from 2013 to 2014. Son has also played supporting roles in television series such as 1980's-set musical drama Lights and Shadows (2011) and spy comedy 7th Grade Civil Servant (2013).

Discography

Filmography

Television series

Variety show

References

External links
 

1985 births
Living people
South Korean television personalities
South Korean male television actors
21st-century South Korean male  singers